846 Naval Air Squadron is a squadron of the Royal Navy's Fleet Air Arm.

Between December 1979 and the summer of 2013, 846 Naval Air Squadron operated the Westland Sea King HC4 helicopter to provide troop transport and load lifting support to 3 Commando Brigade Royal Marines. Based at RNAS Yeovilton in Somerset, 846 NAS stood down in the summer of 2013 and its personnel, buildings and equipment were amalgamated into 845 Naval Air Squadron.

The squadron stood up on 30 September 2014 with the AgustaWestland Merlin HC3 and it now holds the Operational Conversion Flight and Maritime Counter Terrorism Role.

History

Second World War

846 Naval Air Squadron was established in April 1943 at the Naval Air Station Quonset Point, Rhode Island, United States. It was equipped with 12 Grumman Avenger I torpedo bombers. Two months later the squadron embarked on the escort carrier  and was transferred to the UK. HMS Tracker was first assigned to convoys going to Gibraltar, then to Murmansk. On the latter voyage, aircraft from 846 NAS attacked eight German U-boats.

HMS Tracker was damaged in June 1944 in a collision with the Canadian frigate HMCS Teme (K458) while forming part of the naval screen for the D-Day landings, and the squadron disembarked to RAF Limavady airfield, Northern Ireland, joining 15 Group RAF Coastal Command.

The remainder of 846 NAS operated from HMS Trumpeter or RNAS Hatston in Orkney up to May 1945. On 4 May 1945, twelve Avenger and four Wildcat aircraft of the squadron took part in Operation Judgement, Kilbotn, the last air-raid of the war in Europe. The fighter flight was disbanded after the end of hostilities in Europe.

846 NAS was then assigned to the 4th Carrier Group and should deploy to the Far East aboard the fleet carrier . However, a change of plans led to the squadron becoming a trials unit. It was renumbered 751 NAS and was disbanded at Machrihanish, in September 1945.

Borneo
846 NAS was reformed in 1962 as a Commando squadron equipped with the Westland Whirlwind HAS.7. It was deployed to Borneo aboard the commando carrier  and flew in support of actions against guerrillas during the Indonesia–Malaysia confrontation. British Army units gave 846 NAS the nickname 'Junglies' in Borneo, which the squadron has kept until today.

After returning for the Far East, 846 NAS was disbanded again, only to be reformed in 1968 at RNAS Culdrose. This time the squadron was equipped with the Westland Wessex HU.5. The squadron deployed aboard the dock-landing ship  and conducted cold weather trials in Norway. In May 1972, the squadron was relocated to RNAS Yeovilton as the Wessex Headquarters and Trials Squadron. In February 1979 the squadron was deployed aboard the commando carrier . In December of the same year 846 NAS started to convert to the Westland Sea King HC.4.

Falklands War
In April 1982, 846 NAS embarked aboard the carrier  as part of the Royal Navy task force in the Falklands War. During the war 846 NAS Sea King's flew over 2800 hours, completed 10,000 individual troop moves and transported more than 81,600 t of freight.

The squadron was awarded the Boyd Trophy for these operations.

Gulf War

In 1990, 846 NAS took part in the Gulf War. In six weeks the squadron flew a total of 1200 hours in support of Allied ground forces. After the end of hostilities the squadron moved to northern Iraq to assist with humanitarian relief for the Kurds. An element of 846 NAS also remained in theatre post Gulf War to assist with mine clearance operations, alongside an element from 845 NAS.  These aircraft were then deployed to Bangladesh aboard RFA Fort Grange to assist with the relief effort after the 1991 Bangladesh Cyclone as part of Operation Manna.

Yugoslav Wars
In January 1993, 846 NAS was deployed until March aboard the carrier HMS Ark Royal to the Adriatic as part of UN operations in Yugoslavia. Shortly after returning to the UK the squadron was deployed to Northern Ireland to replace 707 NAS to provide support to security forces. It returned to the Balkans to provide air support for Multi-National Division-SW (SFOR), which was then commanded by the British, in Bosnia. This deployment lasted until 2002.

Afghanistan
Since 2007, the 10 Sea King HC4/HC3i helicopters of 846 NAS were committed to the Kandahar and Helmand provinces in Afghanistan in support of 3 Commando Brigade Royal Marines.

Present day

846 NAS re-equipped with the AgustaWestland Merlin HC3 on 30 September 2014 at RAF Benson. The squadron moved back to its usual home of RNAS Yeovilton in March 2015. As of 12 March 2019 846 NAS had received the first of its Merlin HC4 helicopters, marking another major step in the transition from Royal Air Force to Royal Navy dominance in the Commando warfare role.

Affiliations
Sherborne School CCF
King's School, Bruton CCF
Cardiff URNU
1st Battalion, Argyll and Sutherland Highlanders

Aircraft operated
The squadron operated a variety of different aircraft and versions:
 Grumman Avenger I & II
 Grumman Wildcat V & VI
 Westland Whirlwind HAS.7
 Westland Wessex HU.5
 Westland Sea King HC.4
 Westland Sea King HAS.6(CR)
 AgustaWestland Merlin HC3/i3
 AgustaWestland Merlin HCi3/HC4 (current)

Battle honours 
846 Naval Air Squadron has received the following battle honours:

 Atlantic 1944
 Arctic 1944–1945
 Norway 1944–1945
 Normandy 1944–1945
 Falklands 1982

References

Citations

Bibliography

External links
 

846
Military units and formations of the United Kingdom in the Falklands War